The La Gorce Open was a golf tournament on the PGA Tour from 1928 to 1931. It was held at the La Gorce Country Club in Miami Beach, Florida.

Winners
1931 Gene Sarazen
1930 Bill Mehlhorn
1929 Horton Smith
1928 Johnny Farrell

External links
La Gorce Country Club

Former PGA Tour events
Golf in Florida
Sports in Miami-Dade County, Florida
Miami Beach, Florida
Recurring sporting events established in 1928
Recurring sporting events disestablished in 1931
1928 establishments in Florida
1931 disestablishments in Florida